The One Pro Wrestling (1PW) World Heavyweight Championship was a professional wrestling championship in One Pro Wrestling. The title was established in 2006 and was the highest ranked championship in the company. Title reigns are determined by professional wrestling matches with different wrestlers, involved in pre-existing scripted feuds, plots and storylines. Wrestlers are portrayed as either villains or fan favorites as they follow a series of tension-building events, which culminate into a wrestling match or series of matches for the championship.

Title history

Combined reigns

References

External links

One Pro Wrestling championships
Heavyweight wrestling championships